Mustafa is one of the names of Prophet Muhammad, and the name means "chosen, selected, appointed, preferred", used as an Arabic given name and surname. Mustafa is a common name in the Muslim world.

Given name

Moustafa
 Moustafa Amar, Egyptian musician and actor
 Moustafa Bayoumi, American writer
 Moustafa Chousein-Oglou, English actor
 Moustafa Farroukh, Lebanese painter
 Moustafa Madbouly, Prime Minister of Egypt
 Moustafa Al-Qazwini, an Islamic Scholar and religious leader
 Moustafa Reyadh, Egyptian football player
 Moustafa Shakosh, Syrian football player
 Moustafa Ahmed Shebto, Qatari athlete

Moustapha
 Moustapha Akkad, Syrian American film producer
 Moustapha Alassane, Nigerien filmmaker
 Moustapha Agnidé, Beninese football player
 Moustapha Lamrabat (born 1983), Moroccan-Flemish photographer
 Moustapha Niasse, Senegalese politician and diplomat
 Abdul Moustapha Ouedraogo, Ivorian football striker
 Moustapha Bayal Sall, Senegalese football midfielder
 Moustapha Salifou, Togolese football midfielder
 Mustapha Cassiem, South African field hockey player

Mostafa
Mostafa Kamal (Bir Sreshtho), freedom fighter of Bangladesh Liberation War, awarded the highest recognition of bravery of Bangladesh, Bir Sreshtho.
 Mostafa Matar (born 1995), Lebanese footballer

Mustafa
 Mustafa I, Mustafa II, Mustafa III, and Mustafa IV, Sultans of the Ottoman Empire
 Mustafa Abdul-Hamid, American basketball player
 Mustafa Abi, Turkish basketball player
 Mustafa Ali, Malaysian Islamic politician
 Mustafa Abubakar (born 1949), Indonesian politician
 Mustafa Adrisi, vice-president of Uganda from 1978 to 1979
 Mustafa Afridi, a Pakistani television screenwriter
 Mustafa Ahmed, spoken word poet from Canada
 Mustafa Amini, Australian association footballer of Afghani descent
 Mustafa Kamal (politician), Bangladeshi politician, cricket official, and businessman
 Mustafa Altıoklar, Turkish film director
 Mustafa Akaydın, Turkish politician
 Mustafa Ali, Pakistani wrestler who joined WWE
 Mustafa Arslanović, Bosnian footballer
 Mustafa Kemal Atatürk, founder of modern Turkey
 Mustafa Aydın, Turkish academic
 Mustafa Badreddine, Hezbollah militant
 Mustafa Barzani, Kurdish nationalist
 Mustafa Cengiz (1949–2021), Turkish businessman and former president of the sports club Galatasaray S.K.
 Mustafa Cevahir, Turkish footballer
 Mustafa Chokaev, nationalist from Turkestan
 Mustafa Çağrıcı, Turkish civil servant
 Mustafa Çakır (born 1986), Turkish yacht racer
 Mustafa Denizli, Turkish football coach
 Mustafa Erdik (born 1948), Turkish earthquake engineer 
 Mustafa Fahmi Pasha, Egyptian politician
 Mustafa Güzelgöz (1921–2005), Turkish librarian
 Mustafa Hadid, Afghan footballer
 Mustafa Hassan, Iraqi footballer
 Mustafa al-Hawsawi, Saudi financer of the September 11 attacks
 Mustafa Hukić, Bosnian footballer
 Mustafa İsmet İnönü, Turkish Army general, Prime Minister, President
 Mustafa Abdul Jalil (born 1952), Libyan politician
 Mustafa al-Kadhimi, Iraqi Prime Minister
 Ghulam Mustafa Khan, scholar
 Mustafa Kamal (mayor) (born 1971), District City Nazim (Mayor) of Karachi
 Mustafa Kamal (judge), Chief Justice of Bangladesh
 Mustafa Karim, Iraqi footballer
 Mustafa Kocabey, Turkish footballer
 Mustafa Korkmaz (born 1988), Dutch wheelchair basketball player of Turkish descent
 Mustafa Kučuković, German footballer
 Ghulam Mustafa Jatoi, Pakistani statesman
 Mustafa Mahmud, Egyptian scientist
 Mustafa Malayekah, Saudi Arabian footballer
 Mustafa Nadarević, Bosnian actor
 Mustafa Nayyem, Afghan-Ukrainian journalist
 Mustafa Özkan, Turkish footballer
 Mustafa Pasha, Georgian noble
 Mustafa Pektemek, Turkish footballer
 Mustafa Qureshi, Pakistani actor
 Mustafa Rahi, Pakistani poet
 Mustafa Sandal, Europe-known Turkish singer-composer
 Mustafa Sarp, Turkish footballer
 Mustafa Shahabi, Syrian agronomist
 Mustafa Shaikh, Indian cricketer
 Mustafa Shokay, Kazakhstani political activist 
 Mustafa Tuna (born 1957), Turkish environmental engineer, politician and Mayor of Ankara
 Mustafa Yılmaz (chess player) (born 1992), Turkish Grand Master of chess
 Mustafa Yumlu, Turkish footballer
 Mustafa Wahba, Saudi politician
 Mustafa Zahid, Pakistani singer
 Mustafa Zaidi, Pakistani poet
 Nur Mustafa Gülen (born 1960), Turkish footballer and coach
 Mustafa Pasha (disambiguation), various people
 Shah Mustafa, Iraqi-Bangladeshi preacher

Mustafah
 Mustafah Muhammad, American footballer

Mustapa
 Mustapa Mohamed, Malaysian politician

Mustapha
 Mustapha Aga, Ottoman Empire ambassador to the Swedish Court
 Mustapha Chadili, Moroccan football goalkeeper
 Mustapha Dahleb, Algerian footballer
 Mustapha Djazaïri, Algerian resistant
 Mustapha Hadji, Moroccan footballer
 Mustapha Harun, Sabahan 1st governor and 3rd chief minister
 Mustapha Ishak Boushaki, Algerian cosmologist
 Mustapha Karkouti, Syrian journalist
 Mustapha Kartali, Islamist guerrilla leader
 Mustapha Khalfi, Moroccan basketball player
 Mustapha Labsi, Algerian arrested on terrorism charges
 Mustapha Larfaoui, Algerian athlete
 Mustapha Matura, Trinidadian playwright
 Mustapha Sama, Sierra Leonean soccer player

Surname

Mostafa
 Amr Mostafa, Egyptian singer and composer
 Ahmed Mostafa (footballer, born 1987), Egyptian footballer
 Ahmed Mostafa (footballer, born 1940), Egyptian footballer
 Hassan Mostafa, Egyptian footballer
 Tarek Mostafa, Egyptian footballer

Moustafa
 Hisham Talaat Moustafa, Egyptian businessman
 Ibrahim Moustafa, Egyptian wrestler
 Tamer Moustafa, Egyptian basketball player

Moustapha
 Baba Moustapha, Chadian playwright
 Hamadou Moustapha, Cameroonian politician

Mustafa
 Nawshirwan Mustafa, Kurdish politician
 Abu Mustafa (1925–1966), Pakistani cricketer
 Abu Ali Mustafa, Palestinian politician
 Allan Mustafa (born 1985), British actor and comedian
 Domenico Mustafà, Italian singer and composer
 Erkan Mustafa (born 1970), British actor
 Fazil Mustafa (born 1965), Azerbaijani politician
 Herro Mustafa (born 1973), American diplomat
 Isaiah Mustafa (born 1974), American actor
 Ismail Isa Mustafa, Bulgarian footballer
 Kara Mustafa, Ottoman Albanian military leader and Vizier in the 17th century, led the 1683 siege of Vienna
 Melton Mustafa, American jazz musician and educator
Mohamed Mustafa (born 1996), Sudanese footballer
 Mustafa Mustafa, Greek politician
 Rahma El Siddig Mustafa, Sudanese disability rights activist
 Şehzade Mustafa (1515–1553), Turkish şehzade (prince)
 Shukri Mustafa, Egyptian Islamist
 Shkodran Mustafi, German footballer

Mustapha
 Boss Mustapha, Nigerian lawyer and politician
 J. F. O. Mustapha, Ghanaian physician and academic
 Joseph Mustapha, Sierra Leonean politician and lawyer
 Riga Mustapha, Ghanaian-born Dutch footballer
 Shettima Mustapha, Nigerian academic and politician

See also
Mustapha (song)
Mustafayev
Mustafa (disambiguation)
Mustafa Prize
Arabic name
Azerbaijani name

 Turkish name

 Pakistani name

Arabic-language surnames
Arabic masculine given names
Bosniak masculine given names
Bosnian masculine given names
Iranian masculine given names
Surnames
Turkish-language surnames
Turkish masculine given names
Azerbaijani masculine given names
Azerbaijani-language surnames

de:Mustafa
es:Mustafá
fr:Moustapha
la:Mustapha
sq:Mustafa
tr:Mustafa
Pakistani masculine given names